Václav Janeček (9 March 1929 – 23 January 1991) was a Czech sprinter. He competed in the 200 metres at the 1952 Summer Olympics and the 1956 Summer Olympics.

References

External links
 

1929 births
1991 deaths
People from Karviná District
People from Cieszyn Silesia
Athletes (track and field) at the 1952 Summer Olympics
Athletes (track and field) at the 1956 Summer Olympics
Czech male sprinters
Olympic athletes of Czechoslovakia
Sportspeople from the Moravian-Silesian Region